Glengarry District High School is an English public high school located in Alexandria, Ontario.

In popular media
The English-French political tensions of Eastern Ontario played out in the halls of GDHS in the 1980s. This was captured in the political study of the town written by University of Toronto political scientist David Rayside in his 1991 book, "A Small Town in Modern Times."

See also
List of high schools in Ontario

References

External links
 

High schools in Ontario
Educational institutions established in 1865
1865 establishments in Canada